This is a list of the Australian species of the family Choreutidae. It also acts as an index to the species articles and forms part of the full List of moths of Australia.

Brenthiinae
Brenthia albimaculana (Snellen, 1875)
Brenthia quadriforella Zeller, 1877

Choreutinae
Asterivora homotypa (Meyrick, 1907)
Asterivora lampadias (Meyrick, 1907)
Choreutis basalis (R. Felder & Rogenhofer, 1875)
Choreutis emplecta (Turner, 1941)
Choreutis limonias (Meyrick, 1907)
Choreutis melanopepla (Meyrick, 1880)
Choreutis metallica (Turner, 1898)
Choreutis ophiosema (Lower, 1896)
Choreutis periploca (Turner, 1913)
Choreutis sycopola (Meyrick, 1880)
Saptha exanthista (Meyrick, 1910)
Saptha libanota (Meyrick, 1910)
Tebenna micalis (Mann, 1857)

External links 
Choreutidae at Australian Faunal Directory

Australia